The Los Angeles Italia Film Festival or Los Angeles-Italia Film Fashion and Art Fest is an Italian film festival held in Grauman's Chinese Theatre, Hollywood, California. The festival honors the best of Italian and Italian-American culture every year through premieres, performances and exhibitions, during the pre-Oscar week. All of its events are open to the public free of charge. The festival is sponsored by the Italian Culture Ministry and Intesa San Paolo Bank.

References

External links
 

Film festivals in California
Annual events in California
Cinema of Italy